Ayvaini Cave is a show cave situated southeast of Lake Uluabat at the district border between Mustafakemalpaşa and Nilüfer in Bursa, Turkey. The cave has two entrances, one in the village Ayvaköy and the other between the villages Doğanalan and Kazanpınar. It is named after the nearby village Ayvaköy.

It is possible to enter the cave at one entrance and leave it from the other. Generally, the cave is entered through its upper entrance in Doğanalanı, where it starts with a  descent. The Mesozoic era-constituted cave features dripstone formations such as stalagmites, stalactites, pillars, wall and drapery dripstones, leakage stones, and around 60 pools and ponds of size . At the exit, the cave features a -long lake. The water level of the ponds and the lake varies depending on seasonal effects.

The cave was discovered by a team of three Spanish people in 1970. Ayvaini Cave is open to public since 2008.

References

Show caves in Turkey
Landforms of Bursa Province
Tourist attractions in Bursa Province